The Song of Love is a 1923 American silent adventure drama film directed by Chester Franklin and Frances Marion, starring Norma Talmadge, Joseph Schildkraut, and Arthur Edmund Carewe. Frances Marion's screenplay is based on the 1922 novel The Dust of Desire by Margaret Peterson.

Plot
The plot of The Song of Love focuses on the relationships among North African Arab citizens, Tuaregs, and French colonial citizens who live in a small outpost with homes, shops, and a bar/social spot. Norma Talmadge is a dancing girl, whose uncle is viewed as a leader in the Arab community and owner of the social spot. Other key roles are an Arab prince, seeking support from the Tuaregs to regain control of the outpost from the French colonists; a French secret service agent (who becomes the love interest); the French colonial leaders: a French spouse and an American.
Through intrigue and conversations, the storyline evolves during the 81 minutes of this movie, resulting in a nighttime battle scene and the main characters professing love for each other.

Cast

Survival
A copy of The Song of Love is in the Library of Congress, Czech Film Archive, and other film archives.

Kino Lorber, Inc., in 2018 produced a series of DVDs to share restored and digitized versions of films produced and directed by women between 1910 and 1923. Since Norma Talmadge produced this film through her company and the co-director is Frances Marion, this film is part of this collection. Many of the films in this collection are now housed with the Library of Congress.

References

External links

 
 
 
 
 Stills at the Norma Talmadge website at stanford.edu
 The Song of Love: A Silent Film Review at moviessilently.com

1923 films
American silent feature films
American black-and-white films
Films directed by Chester Franklin
Films with screenplays by Frances Marion
1920s adventure drama films
American adventure drama films
1923 drama films
1920s American films
Silent American drama films
Silent adventure drama films
1920s English-language films